51 Ophiuchi is a single star located approximately 410 light years away from the Sun in the equatorial constellation of Ophiuchus, northwest of the center of the Milky Way. It is visible to the naked eye as a faint, blue-white point of light with an apparent visual magnitude of 4.81. The star is moving closer to the Earth with a heliocentric radial velocity of –12 km/s.

This object is notable for being "a rare, nearby example of a young planetary system just entering the last phase of planet formation". There is uncertainty about the stellar classification of this star. It has the nominal classification of B9.5IIIe, a B-type giant star with emission lines. However, it has also been classified as an A0 II-IIIe star and as a Herbig Ae/Be star. 51 Ophiuchi is about 300,000 years old with 3.3 times the mass of the Sun and a polar radius 5.7 times the Sun's radius. It is radiating three times the Sun's luminosity from its photosphere at an effective temperature of 9,772 K. The star is spinning rapidly with a projected rotational velocity of 267 km/s, close to the critical rotation rate.

Dust and gas disk
51 Ophiuchi has a disk of dust and gas that appears to be a young debris disk and is probably a planetary system in the late stages of formation.  This system resembles Beta Pictoris, a well known star with a large debris disk, in several ways: spectral type, the presence of an edge-on disk with both gas and dust, and the presence of variable blue-shifted absorption lines suggesting in-falling comets.

The distance to 51 Ophiuchi is much greater than the distance to Beta Pictoris, and its debris disk is relatively compact. As a consequence, the disk around 51 Ophiuchi requires an interferometer to resolve, in contrast to that of Beta Pictoris, which has been observed using visual spectrum imaging. Recent observations of 51 Ophiuchi made with the Keck Interferometer Nuller at the W. M. Keck Observatory show that the disk has two components:  a central cloud of large particles (exozodiacal dust) surrounded by a much larger cloud of small silicate particles extending to about 1,000 astronomical units. The inner disk has a radius approximately four times the distance between the sun and the Earth, with a density of around 100,000 times that of the dust in the Solar System.

The spectra taken by 2020 have indicated the circumstellar disc is similar in composition to interstellar medium. The dominant species in atomic numbers are hydrogen, helium, oxygen, nitrogen, silicon and iron. Surprisingly, the disk was found to be strongly depleted of carbon and carbon monoxide.

References

B-type giants
Circumstellar disks
Emission-line stars
Herbig Ae/Be stars

Ophiuchus (constellation)
Ophiuchi, c
CD-23 13412
Ophiuchi, 51
158643
085755
6519